Tercer Mundo  (Third World), is the sixth album by Argentine musician Fito Páez, released in 1990.

Track listing

Personnel
Performers
 Fito Páez - vocals, electronic keyboard, guitars y percussion
 Ricardo Verdirame - guitar, vocals, electronic keyboard
 Guillermo Vadala - bass, guitars and double bass
Daniel Colombres - drums

Guest musicians 

 Fabiana Cantilo - principal vocalist on "B-Ode y Evelyn", backing vocals on "Religion song", "Yo te amé en Nicaragua" and "Y dale alegría a mi corazón"
 Marcela Chediack - percussion on "Y dale alegría a mi corazón"
 Charly García - piano on "B-Ode y Evelyn"
 David Lebón - vocals on "Y dale alegría a mi corazón", guitar on "Los buenos tiempos"
 Celeste Carballo - vocal arrangement and vocals on "Religion song"
 Sandra Mihanovich - backing vocals on "Fue amor" and "Religion song"
 Celsa Mel Gowland - backing vocals on "Religion song"
 Analía Fink - backing vocals on "Religion song"
 Osvaldo Fattorusso - percussion on "Tercer mundo", "Yo te amé en Nicaragua" and "Y dale alegría a mi corazón"
 Tweety González - electronic keyboard on "Los buenos tiempos"
 Liliana Herrero - vocals on "Religion song"
 Fena Della Maggiora - backing vocals on "Fue amor"
 Luis Alberto Spinetta - vocals on "Y dale alegría a mi corazón", guitar on "Fue amor"
 Jorge "Bruja" Suárez - harmonica on "El chico de la tapa"
 Alejandro Urdapilleta: cana on "El chico de la tapa"
 Hinchada - Pilo, Lucho, Ale, Pingüi, Fito on "El chico de la tapa" and "Tercer mundo"
 Marcelo Ferreyra - trombone
 Enrique Gioia - trumpet
 Víctor Malvicino - baritone saxophone
 Richard Mont - trumpet
 Pablo Rodríguez - tenor saxophone
 Víctor Skorutski - saxophone
 Carlos Villavicencio - arrangements and direction of strings and brass on "B-Ode y Evelyn", "Tercer mundo", "Yo te amé en Nicaragua", "Carabelas de la nada", "Los buenos tiempos" and "Y dale alegría a mi corazón"

References 

1990 albums
Fito Páez albums